Brigadier Andrew Henry Parker Bowles  (born 27 December 1939) is a retired British Army officer. He is the former husband of Queen Camilla, the consort of the current monarch of the United Kingdom.

Early life and family
Andrew Parker Bowles was born on 27 December 1939 as the eldest of four children to Derek Henry Parker Bowles, who was a great-grandson of Thomas Parker, 6th Earl of Macclesfield, and his wife Ann Parker Bowles, daughter of multimillionaire racehorse owner Sir Humphrey de Trafford, 4th Baronet. His christening announcement in The Times listed his godparents as Sir Humphrey de Trafford, the Marquess of Hartington, Miss Mary de Trafford and Miss Swinnerton-Dyer. His parents were close friends of Queen Elizabeth The Queen Mother. Some sources have stated that his godmother was also the Queen Mother. Parker Bowles was a page at the coronation of Queen Elizabeth II. He is an uncle of Derek Paravicini, a blind autistic savant.

As an amateur jockey, Parker Bowles rode in the 1969 Grand National on his horse, The Fossa, finishing the race in 11th place. He played on Prince Charles' polo team during their younger days.

Military career
Parker Bowles was educated at the Benedictine Ampleforth College and the Royal Military Academy Sandhurst. He was commissioned into the Royal Horse Guards (The Blues) in 1960. He was aide-de-camp to the Governor-General of New Zealand, Sir Bernard Fergusson, in about 1965. He was then Adjutant Royal Horse Guards (The Blues) 1967–1969. The regiment became The Blues and Royals (Royal Horse Guards and 1st Dragoons) 1969, and he was the Adjutant of The Blues and Royals 1969–1970. Parker Bowles was promoted to major on 31 December 1971.

He was squadron leader of "B" squadron in 1972 on Operation Motorman in Ulster. Later he was Senior Military Liaison Officer to Lord Soames, when Soames was Governor of Southern Rhodesia during its transition to the majority rule state of Zimbabwe in 1979–1980. He was staff qualified (sq), and became a lieutenant colonel 30 June 1980. In 1980 he was awarded the Queen's Commendation for Bravery in Zimbabwe.

In 1981–1983, he was Commanding Officer of the Household Cavalry Mounted Regiment, and was commanding during the Hyde Park and Regent's Park bombings, when men and horses from his regiment were killed and injured by a terrorist bomb. He was one of the first to the scene, arriving on foot after hearing the bomb blast, and his orders led to the saving of later famous horse Sefton.

From 1987 to 1990, he was colonel Commanding the Household Cavalry and Silver Stick in Waiting to Queen Elizabeth II. On 30 June 1990 he was promoted to brigadier, and was director of the Royal Army Veterinary Corps 1991–1994. He retired in 1994.

Parker Bowles held the following ranks:
 23 January 1962, lieutenant
 23 July 1966, captain
 31 December 1971, major
 1 December 1980, seniority backdated to 30 June 1980, lieutenant colonel
 30 June 1987, colonel
 31 December 1990, seniority backdated to 30 June 1990, brigadier
 27 December 1994, retired

Relationships and children 

His godchildren include the circus trapeze artist Lady Emma Herbert, who was a bridesmaid at his first marriage on 4 July 1973, and Zara Tindall, daughter of Princess Anne.

Princess Anne 
Parker Bowles dated Princess Anne for several years, beginning in June 1970. Parker Bowles's father, Derek, was a good friend to Queen Elizabeth The Queen Mother. According to biographer Sally Bedell Smith, the relationship could not have been "very serious between Anne and Andrew because Andrew was Catholic," therefore any potential marriage was unlikely. The relationship ended sometime prior to Parker Bowles's engagement to Camilla Shand. Parker Bowles and Princess Anne remain friends. Their relationship was depicted in the third season of The Crown.

Camilla Shand (1973–1995) 
In 1973, after an intermittent relationship, Parker Bowles married Camilla Shand in a Roman Catholic ceremony. Shand was a former girlfriend of the then-Prince of Wales. After marriage, the couple lived at Bolehyde Manor and, later, Middlewick House in Wiltshire and had two children, Tom and Laura. Laura attended St Mary's School, Shaftesbury, a Catholic girls' school in Dorset, while Tom attended Eton College. Parker Bowles had numerous extramarital affairs throughout his marriage to Camilla, including with several of Camilla's friends. They divorced in 1995.

Rosemary Pitman (1996–2010)
Parker Bowles married his longtime companion Rosemary Alice Pitman (née Dickinson; 19 January 1940 – 10 January 2010) in 1996, a year after his divorce from Camilla. She was previously married to Lt Col John Hugh Pitman, with whom she had three sons. The couple attended the wedding of Prince Charles and Camilla Parker Bowles, which took place on 9 April 2005. Rosemary died from complications due to cancer in 2010. Princess Anne was present at her funeral service at St Aldhelm's Roman Catholic Church, Malmesbury. Camilla attended her memorial service at the Guards Chapel in March 2010.

In the media 
In 2003, Parker Bowles posed for the painting The Brigadier by Lucian Freud. In 2015 the work sold for $34.89 million at Christie's. He was portrayed by Simon Wilson in Whatever Love Means (2005) and by Andrew Buchan in The Crown (2019).

Honours
 He was awarded an Honorary Fellowship by the Royal Veterinary College in 2003.

References

1939 births
Living people
People from Wiltshire
Blues and Royals officers
Royal Horse Guards officers
English Roman Catholics
English polo players
Officers of the Order of the British Empire
People educated at Ampleforth College
Graduates of the Royal Military Academy Sandhurst
British military personnel of The Troubles (Northern Ireland)
Andrew
De Trafford family
Sportspeople from Yorkshire
Recipients of the Queen's Commendation for Bravery
Military personnel from Surrey
British Army brigadiers